Ratowice may refer to the following places in Poland:
Ratowice, Lower Silesian Voivodeship (south-west Poland)
Ratowice, Greater Poland Voivodeship (west-central Poland)